Anthony Paul Frederick Hadley (born 5 July 1955) is an English former professional footballer who played as a central defender.

Career
Born in Rochford, Hadley played for Essex Football League rivals Southend United and Colchester United amongst a variety of Essex non-league teams during his professional career that spanned 11 years.

Honours

Club
 Southend United
 Football League Fourth Division runner-up: 1977–78

References

External links
 
 Tony Hadley at Colchester United Archive Database

1955 births
Living people
People from Upminster
Footballers from the London Borough of Havering
English footballers
Association football defenders
Basildon United F.C. players
Southend United F.C. players
Colchester United F.C. players
Maldon & Tiptree F.C. players
Chelmsford City F.C. players
English Football League players